This page shows the results of the Cycling Competition at the 1975 Pan American Games, held from October 12 to October 26, 1975 in Mexico City, Mexico. There were a total number of six events, with only men competing.

Men's competition

Men's 1.000m Match Sprint (Track)

Men's 1.000m Time Trial (Track)

Men's 4.000m Individual Pursuit (Track)

Men's 4.000m Team Pursuit (Track)

Men's Individual Race (Road)

Men's Team Time Trial (Road)

References
Results

Pan American
1975 Pan American Games
1975
1975 in road cycling
1975 in track cycling
International cycle races hosted by Mexico